Promises, Promises is a musical with music by Burt Bacharach, lyrics by Hal David and a book by Neil Simon. It is based on the 1960 film The Apartment written by Billy Wilder and I. A. L. Diamond. The story concerns a junior executive at an insurance company who seeks to climb the corporate ladder by allowing his apartment to be used by his married superiors for trysts.

The musical premiered in 1968 on Broadway with choreography by Michael Bennett and direction by Robert Moore. It starred Jerry Orbach as Chuck Baxter and Jill O'Hara as Fran Kubelik. It closed after 1,281 performances. A West End production opened in 1969 featuring Tony Roberts and Betty Buckley. The cast album was nominated for the Grammy Award for Best Musical Theater Album, and two songs from the show (the title tune and "I'll Never Fall in Love Again") became hit singles for Dionne Warwick.

Productions

Broadway (1968–1972) 
After a tryout at the National Theatre in Washington, D.C.  and the Colonial Theatre in Boston, MA. the show premiered on Broadway at the Shubert Theatre on December 1, 1968, and closed on January 1, 1972, after 1,281 performances. Directed by Robert Moore, and choreographed by Michael Bennett with Bob Avian as assistant choreographer, the cast featured Jerry Orbach as Chuck Baxter, Jill O'Hara as Fran Kubelik, and Edward Winter as J. D. Sheldrake. Featured in small or ensemble roles were Kelly Bishop, Graciela Daniele, Ken Howard, Baayork Lee, Donna McKechnie, Frank Pietri, Margo Sappington, and Marian Mercer. A national tour starring Tony Roberts from the West End production as Chuck Baxter,  Melissa Hart as Fran, and Bob Holiday as Sheldrake performed throughout the United States during the early 1970s. Lorna Luft played Fran Kubelik on Broadway from October 1971 to January 1972. A second national tour starred Will McKenzie as Chuck Baxter; featured ensemble players included Trudi Green, Laurent Giroux, Guy Allen, Dennis Grimaldi, Brandt Edwards, and Patti McKenzie. Another tour starred Donald O'Connor as Chuck Baxter, Betty Buckley as Fran Kubelik, and Barney Martin as Dr. Dreyfuss; featured ensemble players included Laurent Giroux, Carla Lewis, and Dennis Grimaldi.

The show's now-iconic first act closing dance number, "Turkey Lurkey Time", underwent significant changes from its initial debut. According to McKechnie, who portrayed Miss Della Hoya, the original choreography was staged on three desks pushed together, and was meant to reflect what the three secretaries might realistically have choreographed in their living rooms. During the first night of the show's Boston tryouts, the number was extremely poorly received by the audience. Bennet and Avian immediately reworked the choreography that same night in their hotel room, changing it from its initial realistic approach into its subsequent, high-energy form. The number has been described as a cult classic, and is one McKechnie described in her 2006 memoir as "incredibly athletic" and designed to secure the audience's return after the intermission, despite the number having little to do with the musical's overall plot.

West End (1969) 
The show was first produced in London's West End at the Prince of Wales Theatre in 1969, featuring Tony Roberts and Betty Buckley. It ran for 560 performances.

Broadway revival (2010–2011) 
A reading for a revival of the musical was held in October 2008 with Sean Hayes and Anne Hathaway.

The revival opened at the Broadway Theatre on April 25, 2010, after previews starting on March 27. Directed and choreographed by Rob Ashford, the revival starred Sean Hayes, Kristin Chenoweth, Brooks Ashmanskas, Katie Finneran, and Tony Goldwyn. The Bacharach-David songs "I Say a Little Prayer", a 1967 million-selling hit written for Dionne Warwick, and "A House Is Not a Home" were added to the score.

Due to pregnancy, Katie Finneran departed the role of Marge on October 10, 2010, and was replaced by Saturday Night Live veteran Molly Shannon. Hayes, Chenoweth, and Shannon remained with the production until its closing on January 2, 2011. The show had 291 performances and 30 previews.

Other productions 
Regional theatre productions have included a 1993 staging at the Goodspeed Opera House in Connecticut. New York City Center Encores! held a staged concert in March 1997, starring Martin Short, Kerry O'Malley, Eugene Levy, Dick Latessa, and Christine Baranski.

2014 San Francisco
The musical opened at San Francisco Playhouse in November 2014 and closed in January 2015. It featured Jeffrey Brian Adams in the role of Chuck and Monique Hafen as Fran.

2017 Southwark Playhouse, London
This production ran from January to February, directed by Bronagh Lagan with Gabriel Vick in the role of Chuck and Daisy Maywood as Fran.

Synopsis

Act I
Chuck Baxter is an ambitious bachelor and junior executive for a large insurance company, Consolidated Life, who expresses his frustrations and hopes for career advancement ("Half as Big as Life"). To curry favor with higher-ups in the company, he allows his apartment to be used for their romantic trysts in return for promises of promotion ("Upstairs"). Chuck has his own eye set on Fran Kubelik, a waitress in the company cafeteria whom he's always admired from a distance. While talking together she wonders if she will ever find someone to share her life with. Chuck hopes that she might notice him ("You'll Think of Someone").

J.D. Sheldrake, the company's powerful personnel director, notices the glowing reviews written by Chuck's superiors and deduces the reason for them.  He requests sole use of the apartment for his affairs in exchange for Chuck's long-awaited promotion and tickets to a basketball game ("Our Little Secret"). (In the 2010 revival, the song "I Say a Little Prayer For You" was added for a scene in which Fran tells female workmates about flowers she has received from a new "mystery individual".) Chuck asks Fran to attend the basketball game with him, and she agrees to meet him there after first having a drink with her soon-to-be ex-lover ("She Likes Basketball").

Fran's lover turns out to be the married Sheldrake. Fran wants to end the relationship, but Sheldrake talks her into spending the evening with him ("Knowing When to Leave"). Though Fran stands him up, Chuck forgives her. When he informs the other executives that his apartment is no longer available for their use, they express dismay ("Where Can You Take a Girl?"). Meanwhile,  Sheldrake wonders why he is drawn to affairs ("Wanting Things"). The scene shifts to the company Christmas party, where everyone is enjoying themselves ("Turkey Lurkey Time"). Miss Olsen, Sheldrake's secretary, reveals to Fran that she is simply the latest in a long line of Sheldrake's mistresses. The first-act curtain falls as Fran is driven to misery ("A House is Not a Home" in the 2010 revival), and Chuck discovers that Fran is the one Sheldrake has been taking to his apartment.

Act II
A despondent Chuck spends Christmas Eve trying to drink away his troubles at a bar, where he meets another tipsy lonelyheart, Marge MacDougall, who agrees to come back to his apartment ("A Fact Can Be a Beautiful Thing"). In the meantime, at Chuck's apartment, Fran confronts Mr. Sheldrake about his earlier affairs. While he admits to the affairs, he declares his love for Fran, but tells her that he must leave in order to catch his train home to spend Christmas Eve with his family. A despairing Fran discovers Chuck's sleeping pills and takes the whole bottle ("Whoever You Are").

When Chuck arrives with Marge, he discovers Fran on his bed.  After quickly disposing of Marge, a frantic Chuck gets his neighbor, Dr. Dreyfuss, to come over and together they save her life.  The next morning Chuck calls Sheldrake to let him know what happened. Sheldrake says he can't leave for the city without his wife knowing and asks Chuck to take care of Fran ("Christmas Day").

Over the next few days Chuck and Dreyfuss try to keep Fran's spirits up to prevent a relapse into suicidal behavior ("A Young Pretty Girl Like You"). Chuck and Fran play gin rummy and discuss their problems, growing closer ("I'll Never Fall In Love Again"). Mr. Kirkeby, one of Chuck's former 'clients', discovers that Fran has been staying at Chuck's apartment, so as revenge for cutting him and the others off from using the apartment he tells Fran's overly protective brother where she has been staying.  Karl Kubelik then comes to the apartment to collect her, and believing that Chuck is the cause of her current state he punches Chuck.

Miss Olsen soon discovers that Sheldrake's actions led to Fran almost killing herself. She quits her job and tells Mrs. Sheldrake all about her husband's affairs. She leaves him, resulting in his desperation to woo Fran back. Sheldrake asks for the keys to Chuck's apartment again on New Year's Eve to take Fran there.  Chuck refuses and quits his job rather than allow Sheldrake to take Fran to his apartment ever again ("Promises, Promises").

Deciding that he has to get away, Chuck begins packing to move elsewhere when Fran comes to see him. Sheldrake had told her that Chuck had refused him access and quit, and she realizes that Chuck is the one who really loves her.  As they resume their earlier game of gin, he declares his love for her, to which she replies, "Shut up and deal".

Notable casts and characters

Characters 
Chuck Baxter - An office worker
Fran Kubelik - A restaurant waitress
J.D. Sheldrake - A personnel manager
Dr. Dreyfuss - A neighbor
Marge MacDougall - A bar acquaintance
Dobitch, Kirkeby, Eichelberger, and Vanderhof
Vivien Della Hoya, Miss Polansky, and Miss Ginger Wong
Karl - Fran's brother
Mrs. Sheldrake
Miss Olsen

Musical numbers 

Act One
"Overture" - Orchestra
"Half as Big as Life" - Chuck
"Grapes of Roth" - Orchestra
"Upstairs" - Chuck
"You'll Think of Someone" - Chuck & Fran
"Our Little Secret" - Chuck & Sheldrake
"I Say a Little Prayer" + - Fran
"She Likes Basketball" - Chuck
"Knowing When to Leave" - Fran
"Where Can You Take a Girl?" - Dobitch, Kirkeby, Eichelberger, & Vanderhof
"Wanting Things" - Sheldrake
"Turkey Lurkey Time" - Miss Della Hoya, Miss Polansky, Miss Wong, & Ensemble
"A House Is Not a Home" + - Fran

Act Two
"A Fact Can Be a Beautiful Thing" - Marge & Chuck
"Whoever You Are (I Love You)" - Fran
"Christmas Day" - Orchestra
"A House Is Not A Home (reprise)" + - Chuck
"A Young Pretty Girl Like You" - Dr. Dreyfuss & Chuck
"I'll Never Fall in Love Again" - Chuck & Fran
"Promises, Promises" - Chuck
"I'll Never Fall In Love Again (reprise)" + - Chuck & Fran

+ Added for the 2010 revival

Songs cut in the out-of-town tryouts included: "Tick Tock Goes The Clock," "We Did The Right Thing," "Loyal, Resourceful And Cooperative," "Wouldn't That Be A Stroke Of Luck," "Hot Food," "What Am I Doing Here?"

Songs written for the show but not used included: "Let's Pretend We're Grown Up," "Phone Calls," "In The Right Kind Of Light."

Reception
From The New York Times: "Though the work featured memorable dance sequences by a choreographer on the rise named Michael Bennett, what really set it apart was its score, written by the solid-gold pop composer Burt Bacharach with lyrics by Hal David. Mr. Bacharach introduced to Broadway not only the insistently rhythmic, commercial-jingle buoyancy of 1960's soft-core radio fare, but also a cinematic use of Teflon-smooth, offstage backup vocals."

Awards and nominations

Original Broadway production

2010 Broadway revival

In popular culture 
The title song, "Whoever You Are (I Love You)" and "Wanting Things" were all featured on Dionne Warwick's Scepter LP Promises, Promises which was released in 1968 before the show opened on Broadway. "I'll Never Fall in Love Again" was a hit for Dionne Warwick in the US (No. 6) and for Bobbie Gentry in the UK (No. 1). "Christmas Day" was recorded by Johnny Mathis for his Christmas album Give Me Your Love for Christmas (1969). The title song and "Turkey Lurkey Time" were featured on Glee and the latter performed in Camp.

Notes

References
Dominic, Serene.  The Little Red Book of Burt Bacharach, New York: Schirmer; London: Music Sales, 2002.

External links

Internet Broadway Database listing, 2010
Listing with plot and production data from guidetomusicaltheatre.com
Barnes, Clive. The New York Times 1968 review reprinted in Brantley, Ben, The New York Times Book of Broadway, p. 177,  Macmillan, 2001 
The New York Times review of a 1984 dinner-theatre production

1968 musicals
Musicals based on films
Broadway musicals
Musicals by Neil Simon
Plays set in New York City
Tony Award-winning musicals